Qangwa is a village in North-West District of Botswana. It is located close to the western border against Namibia, and has a primary school and a health clinic. The population was 337 in 2001 census.

References

North-West District (Botswana)
Villages in Botswana